Camelops is an extinct genus of camels that lived in North and Central America, ranging from Alaska to Guatemala, from the middle Pliocene to the end of the Pleistocene. It is more closely related to the Old World dromedary and bactrian and wild bactrian camels than the New World guanaco, vicuña, alpaca and llama; making it a true camel of the Camelini tribe. "camel-face".

Taxonomy and evolution

The genus Camelops first appeared during the middle Pliocene (about 4.0–3.2 million years ago (Mya) in southern North America and became extinct at the end of the Pleistocene (around 11,000 years ago). Despite the fact that camels are popularly associated with the deserts of Asia and Africa, the family Camelidae, which comprises camels and llamas, originated in North America during the middle Eocene period, at least 44 Mya. Both the camel and horse families originated in the Americas and migrated into Eurasia via the Bering Strait. Modern camels are descended from the extinct genus Paracamelus, which probably crossed the Bering land bridge into Asia between 7.5 and 6.5 Mya. The divergence between Paracamelus and Camelops occurred about 11–10 Mya. Paracamelus would continue to live in North America as the High Arctic camel until the middle Pleistocene.

During Pleistocene warm periods, a smaller morph of Camelops inhabited Alaska and northern Yukon. These specimens date to around 50–45 thousand years ago, and seem to have been extirpated from the area after this time, similar to the contemporaneous mastodon, the ground sloth Megalonyx, and the giant beaver Castoroides. The skull of a Camelops specimen was found above the Glenns Ferry Formation in present-day Idaho in a thick layer of coarse gravel known as the Tauna Gravels. Above this layer of gravel is another layer of fine river channel sands, where the skull was found. The age of this fossil is as young as 2 million years old and perhaps even younger, which can be inferred because it is younger than the other fossils found at the Hagerman Fossil Beds National Monument.

During the late Oligocene and early Miocene periods, camels apparently underwent swift evolutionary change, resulting in several genera with different anatomical structures, ranging from those with short limbs, those with gazelle-like bodies, and giraffe-like camels with long legs and long necks. This rich diversity decreased until only a few species, such as Camelops hesternus, remained in North America, before going extinct entirely around 11,000 years ago. By the end of the Pleistocene, with the extinction of Paracamelus and Titanotylopus, Camelops was the only true camel remaining in North America and possibly both Americas. Camelops extinction was part of a larger North American extinction in which native horses, mastodons, and other camelids also died out. Possible causal factors for this megafaunal extinction include global climate change and hunting pressure from human beings. The mass extinction coincided roughly with the appearance of people belonging to the big game-hunting Clovis culture, who were prolific hunters with distinct fluted stone tools, which allowed for a spear shaft to be attached to the stone tool. Biochemical analyses have shown that Clovis tools were used in butchering camels.

Description

Because soft tissues are generally not preserved in the fossil record, it is not certain if Camelops possessed hump(s), like modern camels, or lacked ones, like modern Camelidaes of South America (guanacos and vicuñas). One-humped camels are now known to have evolved from two-humped camels, but two-humps, as an evolutionary outcome, likely associated with arctic climates and two-humped camels presumably evolved into one-humped camels in warmer regions in Eurasia, while Camelops first appeared in southern North America and lived among both warmer and colder regions of the continent until early Holocene.

Palaeobiology

Plant remains found in the teeth of the Rancho La Brea C. hesternus fossils further reveal that rather than being limited to grazing, this species likely ate mixed species of plants, including coarse shrubs growing in coastal southern California. Camelops probably could travel long distances, similar to modern camel species. Whether or not Camelops could survive for long periods without water, as with extant camels, is still unknown; this may have been an adaptation that occurred much later, after camelids migrated to Asia and Africa.

The creosote bush from the US-Mexican border has been speculated to be part of Camelops'''s diet. Although no living ungulate in the area consumes it, it was readily consumed by the Arabian camels of the experimental United States Camel Corps in the mid-19th century.

Extinction

The last species of Camelops are hypothesized to have disappeared as a result of the Blitzkrieg model. This model presents the hypothesis that Camelops, along with other North American megafauna, disappeared as new cultures of experienced and efficient hunters moved southeastward across the continent. The result of this migration and expansion of human populations was a significant reduction in range for the megafauna. Of the many Camelops specimens recovered in North America, only a small number demonstrate modification through human actions. Some specimens have been interpreted as having been killed by humans based on the presence of spirally fractured bone fragments. None of the reported Camelops sites has been associated with stone tools, however, which would be an indicator of possible human use.

At many of these Camelops sites,  no fossils have been found of carcasses that were evidently processed, but rather small fragments and pieces of remains. Researchers originally thought that Camelops species were in fact hunted and butchered by early humans in North America because of these reasons: the fragmenting of bones into shapes that look like tools, damage or weathering of the “working” edge of said tools, having attributes that were similar to the making of chopping tools, and scarred fragments from possible chopping tools. Further examination showed, though, that these assumptions were misguided, and that while humans did coexist and associate with Camelops, human use has yet to be completely proven as the sole cause of extinction.

See alsoAepycamelusEulamaopsOxydactylusPoebrotheriumProcamelusProtylopusStenomylus''
Pleistocene megafauna
Snowmastodon Project

References

Prehistoric camelids
Prehistoric even-toed ungulate genera
Pliocene even-toed ungulates
Pleistocene even-toed ungulates
Piacenzian first appearances
Holocene extinctions
Pliocene mammals of North America
Pleistocene mammals of North America
Taxa named by Joseph Leidy
Fossil taxa described in 1854